The CSEM is a Swiss research and development centre (R&D) active in the fields of precision manufacturing, digitalization, and renewable energy. It follows a public-private not-for-profit partnership model. CSEM develops and transfers technologies that are considered relevant in progressing the Swiss national economy. CSEM is a R&D Center of Science and technology in Switzerland.

Organization 
CSEM’s mission is to develop and transfer technologies to the industrial sector to reinforce the sector’s competitive advantage. It works towards building ties between higher education institutions and partners in Industry,  and aims to help entrepreneurs with the creation of start-up companies. 
CSEM’s headquarters are located in Neuchâtel, Switzerland. It also has three regional research and development centers in the Swiss cities of: Muttenz, Alpnach and Landquart, and an office at the Technopark Zürich.

History 
CSEM was founded in 1984 by The Swiss Federal Council. It was created to provide Switzerland with a research and development (R&D) center that would enable the country to keep pace with technological innovation. Presently, CSEM operates as a Research and Technology Organization (RTO). In 1984, the City of Neuchâtel, in the Canton of Neuchâtel, Switzerland, was chosen as the location for the new research and development center due to its long tradition in watchmaking and its heritage in manufacturing industrial, precision, and mechanical components.

CSEM was formed by merging three different companies:
 LSRH, the Swiss Laboratory for Horological Research (Laboratoire suisse de recherches horlogères)
 CEH, the Centre of Electronic Horology (Centre électronique horloger)
 FSRM, the Swiss Foundation for Microtechnology Research

Today, CSEM has over 525 employees, and operates throughout Switzerland.

Former CSEM chief executive officers

Notes and references

See also 
 Science and technology in Switzerland

Electronics companies of Switzerland
Companies based in Neuchâtel